Prakash Naik (born March 07, 1975) is an Indian politician from Chhattisgarh. Naik was elected as the MLA from Raigarh constituency of the Chhattisgarh assembly in 2018 elections. He represents the Raigarh constituency in the Chhattisgarh Legislative Assembly. He contested from Congress party.

Early life 
Prakash Naik is a son of former Congress MLA and former minister Dr. Shakrajeet Nayak on 7 March 1975 in a politicians family who lived in Nawapali, a village in Raigarh district of Madhya Pradesh (present-day Chhattisgarh). His father Dr. Shakrajeet Naik is a former minister and political leader in Raigarh Constituency.

Educational background 
Raigarh, Madhya Pradesh (present-day Chhattisgarh).

References

External links 

 Prakash Naik on Facebook
 Prakash Naik on Twitter

Indian National Congress politicians
1975 births
Living people
People from Raigarh
People from Raigarh district
People from Chhattisgarh